Legislative elections were held in Portuguese Macau on 28 September 1980, returning 17 members of the Legislative Assembly of Macau, with 6 directly elected by electorates, 6 indirectly elected by special interest groups and 5 appointed by the Governor.

This was the second election for the new legislature, and only those with Portuguese nationality or the descendants of Portuguese people were eligible to vote. The election saw six directly elected seats were all won by the Macau-born Portuguese. Susana Chou, the only Chinese elected through the Macau constituency last time, did not stay in the Legislative Assembly. Association for the Defense of Macau Interest (ADIM), led by conservative Carlos d'Assumpção, and Democratic Centre of Macau, led by radicals, both kept their respective four and one seat, with ADIM remained the largest party. Governor Nuno Viriato Tavares de Melo Egídio then appointed five other members to the Legislative Assembly.

Results

Members

References

Macau
Legislative
Elections in Macau
Macau